Ethel Carrick, later Ethel Carrick Fox (7 February 1872 – 17 June 1952) was an English Impressionist and Post-Impressionist painter. Much of her career was spent in France and in Australia, where she was associated with the movement known as the Heidelberg School.

Life
Ethel Carrick was born in Uxbridge, Middlesex, to Emma (Filmer) Carrick and Albert William Carrick, a wealthy draper. The family of ten children lived at Brookfield House, Uxbridge. She trained in London at the Guildhall School of Music and at the Slade School of Fine Art under Henry Tonks (ca. 1898-1903). She married the Australian Impressionist painter Emanuel Phillips Fox in 1905. They moved to Paris, where they remained until 1913. She travelled widely in Europe, North Africa, and the South Pacific (Tahiti) during this period and made trips to Australia in 1908 and 1913.

The outbreak of World War I brought Carrick and her husband to Melbourne, Australia, where they  organised to raise war funds from artists and to support the French Red Cross.

Emanuel died of cancer in 1915, and the following year Carrick began two decades of travels that took her through the Middle East, South Asia including India, and Europe. She returned intermittently to Australia to exhibit her work and go out on painting expeditions around the country. In the 1920s, she was recommended by the Académie de la Grande Chaumière in Paris as a private teacher of still life painting, and she counted a number of Australians and Americans in Paris among her students.

She died in Melbourne in 1952, aged 80.

Art career and critical estimation

Mainly a painter, Carrick is known for her floral still life, landscapes and scenes of outdoor urban life in parks and on beaches. Some of these draw on her international travels, such as her paintings of outdoor markets in the Middle East and elsewhere. In the 1920s, she began painting flower studies, which overall are more conventional than her earlier work. In the 1930s, she created some lithographs, and during World War II, which she spent in Australia, she painted some scenes of women war workers.

Carrick began as an Impressionist plein air painter but fairly quickly moved to a more Post-Impressionist style featuring blockier compositions and sharper color contrasts. Some of the works produced around 1911-12 are distinctly Fauvist in their strong colors, high abstraction, and loose handling of the paint.

Carrick first showed her work in London in 1903. She exhibited at the Paris Salon d'Automne from 1906 onwards, the London Royal Academy of Arts, the Société Nationale des Beaux-Arts (from 1906 on), and various progressive galleries in Melbourne and Sydney, Australia (from 1908 on). In addition to her own solo and group exhibitions, she was in dual shows with her husband at the Melbourne Athenaeum in 1914 and again in 1944. 

In 1911, she became sociétaire of the Salon d'Automne, and she served as a jury member from 1912 to around 1925, both unusual positions for women to hold and marks of the high regard in which she was held by the Paris art world. Prior to World War I, she also served as the vice-president of the International Union of Women Artists. Late in her career, in the 1940s and 1950s, she exhibited with the Melbourne Society of Women Painters and Sculptors.

In her lifetime, Carrick's reputation was eclipsed by her husband's, in part because she spent a good deal of her time promoting his career rather than her own, lobbying Australian collectors and curators to buy his work and arranging exhibitions both while he was alive and posthumously. In recent years, her reputation has been rising, and critics today consider her work more adventurous than that of her husband. In 1996, one of her paintings set an auction record of A$105,500 for works by an Australian woman artist, and the following year saw the publication of a biography, Ethel Carrick Fox: Travels and Triumphs of a Post-Impressionist by art historian Susanna de Vries. Her Market Under Trees,  sold by Sotheby's in 1999 for A$266,500, was bought at auction for just over A$1 million in 2008.

In 1993, the Waverley City Gallery in Melbourne held the exhibition "Capturing the Orient: Hilda Rix Nicholas & Ethel Carrick in the East", and in 2011, the Queensland Art Gallery held a joint retrospective of the work of Carrick and her husband.

Exhibitions

Solo
 1908: Bernard's Gallery, Collins Street, Melbourne, August 
 1913: 'Paintings by Mrs E Phillips Fox (Miss Ethel Carrick)', The Guildhall, Melbourne, 11 - 26 July
 1913: 'Exhibition of Pictures by Mrs E Phillips Fox (Ethel Carrick)', Anthony Hordern's Fine Art Gallery, Sydney, 6 - 22 November
 1916: 'Exhibition of Oil Paintings by Mrs E Phillips Fox', Anthony Hordern's Fine Art Gallery, Sydney, April
 1925: 'Exhibition of Paintings by Ethel Carrick (Mrs E Phillips Fox)', The New Gallery, Melbourne, 2 -13 June
 1928: 'Exposition Ethel Carrick', Galerie de la Palette Française, Paris, 5 -19 June
 1933: 'Ethel Carrick (Mrs E Phillips Fox) Exhibition of Pictures', Everyman's Lending Library, Melbourne, 24 May - 7 June
 1949: 'Pictures by Ethel Carrick (Mrs E Phillips Fox)', Melbourne Book Club Gallery, 20 June - 2 July
 1949: 'Exhibition of Pictures by Ethel Carrick (Mrs E Phillips Fox)', John Martin's Gallery, Adelaide , 4 - 18 October
 1979: 'Ethel Carrick (Mrs E Phillips Fox): A Retrospective Exhibition', Geelong Art Gallery, 30 March - 4 May 1979 ; toured to SH Ervin Gallery, Sydney, 11 May -  3 June; University Art Museum, Brisbane, 13 June - 5 July

Group exhibitions held during the artist's lifetime 
 1903: Society of Oil Painters, London, 19 October - 12 December
 1904: Felix Art Club (Alpine Art Club), London
 1905: International Society, London International Society of Sculptors, Painters and Gravers January-February, March-May, May, October-December
 1906: Institute of Oil Painters, London 15 October - 12 December
 1906: Felix Art Club, London
 1906: Salon d'Automne, Paris
 1906: Société Nationale des Beaux-Arts, Paris
 1907: Institute of Oil Painters, London 14 October - 12 December
 1907: Salon d' Automne, Paris
 1907: Societe Nationale des Beaux-Arts, Paris
 1907: Royal Academy, London
 1908: Societe Nationale des Beaux Arts, Paris
 1908: Societe Les Quelques, Galerie des Artistes Modernes, Paris
 1908: Salon d' Automne, Paris
 1908: Allied Artists Association, London, July
 1909: 'La Libre Esthetique, Catalogue de la seizieme Exposition a Bruxelles', Brussels, Belgium, 7 March - 12 April
 1909: Societe Les Quelques, Galerie des Artistes Modernes, Paris, February
 1909: Salon d'Automne, Paris
 1909: Allied Artists Association, London
 1909: Victorian Artists Society, Melbourne
 1910: Societe Nationale des Beaux Arts, Paris
 1910: Societe Les Quelques, Galerie des Artistes Modernes, Paris, February
 1910: Salon d'Automne, Paris
 1911: Societe Les Quelques, Galerie des Artistes Modernes, Paris, February
 1911: Salon d'Automne, Paris
 1911: Societe Nationale des Beaux-Arts, Paris
 1912: Societe Nationale des Beaux-Arts, Paris
 1912: Salon d'Automne, Paris
 1913: Societe des Peintres Orientalistes Français 21e Exposition, Grand Palais, Paris, 2-28 February
 1915: 'Australian Artists War Fund Exhibition', Royal Art Society Rooms, Sydney, 9 March
 1915: 'Australian Art Association 3rd Annual Exhibition', Athenaeum, Melbourne, 7-21 October
 1915: Red Cross Fund, Melbourne, March
 1916: 'Art Curio and Antique Exhibition for the French Week Appeal Fund', Town Hall, Melbourne, July
 1916: Royal Society of Oil Painters, London, November
 1917: Royal Academy, London
 1918: 'Salon des Poilus, Exhibition of Pictures for Sale', Athenaeum Gallery, Melbourne, 6-20July (in aid of the French Red Cross)
 1918: 'Exposition de l'Arc-en-Ciel', Galerie de Goupil & Cie, Paris, 8 October - 3 November
 1919: Salon d' Automne, Paris: 315 Mme de Marquette
 1920: Societe Nationale des Beaux-Arts, Paris
 1921: Societe Nationale des Beaux-Arts, Paris
 1921: Salon d'Automne, Paris
 1921: Societe des Artistes lndependants, Paris
 1921: 'Exposition de la Societe coloniale des Artistes Français', Societe des Artistes Français, Grand Palais des Champs Elysees, Paris
 1922: Salon d'Automne, Paris
 1922: Societe Nationale des Beaux-Arts, Paris
 1923: Societe Nationale des Beaux-Arts, Paris
 1923: Salon d' Automne, Paris
 1923: 'Group of Australian Artists', Panton Galleries, London, November
 1924: 'Exhibition of Paintings and Sculptures by Australian Artists in Europe', Faculty of Arts, London, 23 June -12July
 1924: Societe Nationale des Beaux-Arts, Paris
 1924: Salon d'Automne, Paris
 1926: Salon d'Automne, Paris
 1927: Societe Nationale des Beaux-Arts, Paris
 1927: Salon d'Automne, Paris
 1928: Societe Nationale des Beaux-Arts, Paris
 1928: Salon d'Automne, Paris
 1928: International exhibition, Bordeaux: Manly Beach - summer is here (awarded diplome d'honneur)
 1929: Societe Nationale des Beaux-Arts, Paris
 1929: Salon d'Automne, Paris
 1929: Societe des Amis des Arts de Bordeaux, Paris
 1930: Salon d'Automne, Paris
 1930: Societe Nationale des Beaux-Arts, Paris
 1930: Societe des Amis des Arts de Bordeaux, Paris
 1931: Societe Nationale des Beaux-Arts, Paris
 1931: Salon d'Automne, Paris
 1932: Societe Nationale des Beaux-Arts, Paris
 1931: Salon d'Automne, Paris
 1933: Societe Nationale des Beaux-Arts, Paris
 1933: Everyman's Lending Library, Melbourne, May
 1934: 'An Exhibition by Melbourne Painters', Athenaeum Gallery, Melbourne, 27 February- 10 March (in aid of the Hermannsburg water supply, Central Australia)
 1935: Societe Nationale des Beaux-Arts, Paris
 1936: Royal Academy, London
 1937: Societe Nationale des Beaux-Arts, Paris
 1937: Royal Academy, London
 1937: Salon d'Automne, Paris
 1937: Royal Academy, London
 1937: Salon d' Automne
 1939: Royal Academy, London
 1939: Societe Nationale des Beaux-Arts, Paris
 1943-45: Victorian Artists' Society, Melbourne
 1944: 'Paintings by Ethel Phillips Fox, Jean Sutherland and Sybil Craig', KozminskyLower Gallery, Melbourne, 21 November- 1 December
 1945: Macquarie Galleries, Bligh Street, Sydney, 14-26 March
 1945: Anthony Hordern's Fine Art Gallery, Sydney
 1946: 'French Comfort Fund Exhibition', David Jones Art Gallery, Sydney, 20-28 February
 1946: 'French Comfort Fund', Myer's Art Gallery, Melbourne, 19 -29 March
 1947: Victorian Artists' Society, Melbourne
 1951: Royal Scottish Academy, Edinburgh
 1951: Royal Institute of Oil Painters, London

References

Further reading

 Howe, Elin. "Ethel Carrick Fox: The Cheat or the Cheated?". In Wallflowers and Witches: Women and Culture in Australia, 1910-1945, ed. Maryanne Dever. St. Lucia: University of Queensland Press, 1994, pp. 105–14
 Pigot, John. "Les femmes orientalistes: Hilda Rix Nichols and Edith Carrick Fox in the East". Strange Women: Essays in Art and Gender, ed. Jeannette Hoorn. University of Melbourne Press, 1994, pp. 155–68
 Ethel Carrick Fox [Australian art and artists file], State Library Victoria

1872 births
1952 deaths
19th-century English painters
20th-century English women artists
Alumni of the Guildhall School of Music and Drama
Alumni of the Slade School of Fine Art
English women painters
Heidelberg School
Impressionist painters
People from Uxbridge
Post-impressionist painters